"Ghetto Love" is the second single released from Da Brat's second studio album, Anuthatantrum.

Background
Released in early 1997, "Ghetto Love" was Da Brat's second and final single from Anuthatantrum after the gold-selling "Sittin' on Top of the World". The song became Da Brat's second biggest hit, peaking at No. 16 on the Billboard Hot 100. Only her first single, "Funkdafied", which peaked at 6, charted higher. Like the album's previous single, "Ghetto Love" was certified gold by the Recording Industry Association of America, reaching the feat on April 2, 1997. The song was produced by Jermaine Dupri and Carl So-Lowe, featured a chorus sung by the TLC member T-Boz and used a sample of DeBarge's 1983 hit "All This Love".

Single track listing
"Ghetto Love" (Radio Remix)- 3:24  
"Ghetto Love" (Remix) - 3:24  
"Ghetto Love" (Remix Instrumental) - 3:24  
"Ghetto Love" (Radio Edit) - 3:24  
"Ghetto Love" (LP Version) - 3:24  
"Ghetto Love" (LP Instrumental) - 3:24

Charts

Certifications

Sources

1997 singles
Da Brat songs
Tionne Watkins songs
Song recordings produced by Jermaine Dupri
Songs written by Jermaine Dupri
Songs written by Da Brat
1997 songs
Songs written by El DeBarge